Kim Jong-dae (born September 21, 1992), better known by his stage name, Chen, is a South Korean singer and songwriter. He is  a member of the South Korean-Chinese boy band Exo, its subgroup Exo-M and its subunit Exo-CBX, and participated in SM's projects SM the Ballad. He is predominantly known for his role as the main vocalist of Exo. Apart from his group's activities, Chen has also recorded songs for various television dramas, most notably "Best Luck" for It's Okay, That's Love (2014) and "Everytime" for Descendants of the Sun (2016).

In 2019, Chen debuted as a solo singer with the extended play (EP) April, and a Flower, which peaked at number two on South Korea's Gaon Album Chart and spawned the hit single "Beautiful Goodbye". Continuing the success, his second EP, Dear My Dear, accompanied by the single "Shall We?" was released later that same year and charted at number one upon release.

Life and career

1992–2014: Early life and career beginnings

Chen was born on September 21, 1992, in Daejeon and grew up in the Jeongwang-dong neighborhood of Siheung. He became a trainee at SM Entertainment through the company's Casting System in 2011 at the age of 19. On December 29, 2011, he was formally introduced as the fourth member of Exo. He made his first public appearance as an Exo member alongside Luhan, Tao, and Kai at the 2011 SBS Gayo Daejeon.

In 2014, Chen joined the ballad group SM the Ballad, initially formed by SM Entertainment in 2010. On the group's second album Breath, he sang the Chinese version of the lead single "Breath" with Zhang Liyin. He also sang a duet with f(x)'s Krystal titled "When I Was... When U Were...", and "A Day Without You" with Shinee's Jonghyun. Chen performed his duets with Krystal and Jonghyun live at the SM the Ballad Joint Recital on February 12.

In July 2014, Chen released his first solo song since debut titled "The Best Luck" as an original soundtrack for the SBS drama It's Okay, That's Love, which stars his fellow Exo member D.O. "The Best Luck" was awarded the "Best OST by a Male Artist" and "Best OST Song" at the 5th So-Loved Awards and the 16th Seoul International Youth Film Festival respectively. Chen was also invited as a special performer at the 3rd APAN Star Awards on November 11, 2014, where he performed the track live.

2015–2018: Solo activities and Exo-CBX

In June 2015, Chen co-wrote the lyrics for "Promise," a song from the reissued edition of Exo's second studio album Exodus, along with fellow members Chanyeol and Lay. In August 2015, he made his musical theatre debut playing the role of Benny in the SM C&C production In the Heights. He also participated in and became the runner-up in the eleventh round of the music television show King of Mask Singer under the alias "Legendary Guitar Man".

In January 2016, Chen performed John Lennon's song "Imagine" with pianist Steve Barakatt at the Sejong Center for the Performing Arts, as part of UNICEF's "Imagine Project." In February, Chen and South Korean singer Punch released a duet titled "Everytime" as a soundtrack for the KBS drama Descendants of the Sun. The song debuted at number one on Gaon's weekly digital chart. In April, Chen and South Korean rapper Heize released "Lil' Something", a song produced by Vibe member Ryu Jae-hyun, as the ninth weekly single of SM Entertainment's Station music project.

In August 2016, Chen collaborated with fellow Exo members Xiumin and Baekhyun on an original soundtrack titled "For You" for the SBS drama Moon Lovers: Scarlet Heart Ryeo. In October, he collaborated with DJ Alesso on another song for the Station project titled "Years". Later in October, together with Baekhyun and Xiumin, Chen became a member of Exo's first sub unit Exo-CBX. The group made their debut with the extended play Hey Mama!.

In January 2017, Chen collaborated with Dynamic Duo in a song titled "Nosedive", becoming the first artist to be featured in the group's collaboration project "Mixxxture". The song reached number two on the Gaon Digital Chart. In February, he released an original soundtrack titled "I'm Not Okay" for the MBC drama Missing 9 in which his fellow Exo member Chanyeol played a supporting role.

In March, Chen was accepted into the advertisement media MBA program at Hanyang Cyber University. In July, he was revealed to have co-written the lyrics for the tracks "Touch It" and "Ko Ko Bop" from Exo's fourth studio album, The War. In November, Chen collaborated with South Korean singer 10cm on a song titled "Bye Babe" for the second season of SM Entertainment's station project. In December, Chen wrote the lyrics for "Lights Out" from Exo's EP Universe, which he performed alongside fellow members Suho, Baekhyun, and D.O..

On October 16, 2018, Chen released an original soundtrack titled "Cherry Blossom Love Song" for the drama 100 Days My Prince, in which fellow Exo member D.O. played the lead role. He and Chanyeol also participated in writing lyrics for "Love Shot", the title track from the reissued edition of Exo's fifth studio album, Don't Mess Up My Tempo.

2019–present: Solo debut and military service

On February 7, 2019, Chen released an original soundtrack titled "Make It Count" for the drama Touch Your Heart. On March 8, SM Entertainment confirmed that Chen was preparing for his first solo album, which was set to be released in April. Named April, and a Flower and consisting of six songs, the album was released on April 1 with the title song "Beautiful Goodbye". He also participated in writing the lyrics for one of the songs, "Flower". April, and a Flower peaked at number 2 on South Korea's Gaon Album Chart.

In May, Chen collaborated with South Korean singer Onestar for a single titled "May We Bye". In July, he was featured on Ailee's song "Love" from her album Butterfly. On October 1, Chen released his second mini-album, Dear My Dear with six songs including the title track "Shall We?". He participated in writing the lyrics for "My Dear", one of the songs on the album. Dear My Dear debuted at number 1 on the physical album chart and iTunes top album charts in a total of 36 countries.

On January 23, 2020, Chen and Dynamic Duo released another collaboration song titled "You". In September, he released an original soundtrack titled "Your Moonlight" for the drama Do You Like Brahms?. On October 16, Chen released a digital single titled "Hello", before announcing that he was set to enlist for his mandatory military service. 

He enlisted as an active duty soldier on October 26, 2020.  He was discharged on April 25, 2022. On October 11, SM announced his third EP, Last Scene. Initially set to be released on October 31, SM announced that the album release would be postponed to November 14 to respect the mourning period established after the crowd crush in Itaewon.

Personal life
On January 13, 2020, Chen announced his upcoming marriage with his girlfriend, with a private ceremony attended by both of their families. It was also announced that Chen's fiancée was pregnant. Their first child, a daughter, was born on April 29. On January 19, 2022, his wife gave birth to their second child.

Discography

Extended plays
 April, and a Flower (2019)
 Dear My Dear (2019)
 Last Scene (2022)

Filmography

Dramas

Variety shows

Theater

Awards and nominations

Notes

References

External links

  

1992 births
Living people
People from Daejeon
People from Siheung
Exo members
South Korean male singers
South Korean male television actors
South Korean pop singers
Mandarin-language singers of South Korea
South Korean male idols
Melon Music Award winners
21st-century South Korean singers
Japanese-language singers of South Korea
Kyung Hee Cyber University alumni
South Korean contemporary R&B singers
South Korean dance music singers
South Korean electronic music singers
SM Entertainment artists
K-pop singers
South Korean mandopop singers